Bal Karve (बाळ कर्वे) is a veteran Indian actor known for his roles in the Marathi language movies, television and Marathi theatre.

Marathi Serials
He was most popular in the role of Gundyabhau along with Dilip Prabhavalkar as Chimanrao in the hilarious television sitcom Chimanrao Gundyabhau based on CV Joshi's books on Doordarshan.

Marathi Stage
Karve was a part of the original play Suryachi Pille which was directed by Damu Kenkre in 1978 featuring alongside Madhav Vatve, Dilip Prabhavalkar, Mohan Gokhale, Sadashiv Amrapurkar and Shanta Jog.

Films
 1978 Banyabapu
 1993 Lapandav
 1991 Godi Gulabi
 1982 Chatak Chandni

Accolades
 Karve received the Jeevan Gaurav Puraskar at Zee Natya Gaurav awards in 2018.

References

External links
 

Living people
Indian male film actors
Indian male stage actors
Male actors in Marathi cinema
Male actors in Marathi theatre
Indian male television actors
Marathi people
1939 births